Argia tibialis, the blue-tipped dancer, is a species of narrow-winged damselfly in the family Coenagrionidae. It is found in Central America and North America.

The IUCN conservation status of Argia tibialis is "LC", least concern, with no immediate threat to the species' survival. The population is stable.

References

Further reading

External links

 

Coenagrionidae
Articles created by Qbugbot
Insects described in 1842